The 1969–70 USC Trojans men's basketball team represented the University of Southern California during the 1969–70 NCAA University Division men's basketball season.

Roster

Schedule

References 

USC Trojans men's basketball seasons
USC
USC Trojans
USC Trojans